Thera cupressata, the cypress carpet, is a moth of the  family Geometridae. It is found in southern and western Europe, including Great Britain, Germany, France, Switzerland, Italy, Slovenia, Croatia, Greece and Spain.

The wingspan is 28–32 mm. Adults are on wing from May to June and again from August to September in two generations per year.

In southern England the larvae feed on Cupressus macrocarpa and Cupressocyparis leylandii. In France they eat Cupressus sempervirens, Cupressus macrocarpa and Juniperus sabina.

References

External links

Lepiforum.de

Moths described in 1831
Cidariini
Moths of Europe
Moths of Asia
Taxa named by Carl Geyer